Maidstone tram depot is a future depot on the Yarra Trams network in Melbourne. To be built on the corner of Hampstead and Williamson Roads, Maidstone, it will be the home depot for the G class trams.

History
In 2021, the Department of Transport announced that a new depot would be built on a former Victoria University site on the corner of Hampstead and Williamson Roads, Maidstone as the home depot for the G class trams.

References

Proposed transport infrastructure in Australia
Tram depots in Melbourne
Transport in the City of Maribyrnong
Buildings and structures in the City of Maribyrnong